The Liberty Tree (1646–1775) was a famous elm tree that stood in Boston, Massachusetts, near Boston Common, in the years before the American Revolution. In 1765, colonists in Boston staged the first act of defiance against the British government at the tree. The tree became a rallying point for the growing resistance to the rule of Britain over the American colonies, and the ground surrounding it became known as Liberty Hall. The Liberty Tree was felled in August 1775 by Loyalists led by Nathaniel Coffin Jr. or by Job Williams.

History

Stamp Act protests

In 1765, the British government imposed a Stamp Act on the American colonies. It required all legal documents, permits, commercial contracts, newspapers, pamphlets, and playing cards in the American colonies to carry a tax stamp. Colonists were outraged. In Boston, a group of local businessmen calling themselves the Loyal Nine began meeting in secret to plan a series of protests against the Stamp Act.

On August 14, 1765, a crowd gathered in Boston under a large elm tree at the corner of Essex Street and Orange Street (the latter of which was renamed Washington Street) to protest the hated Stamp Act. Hanging from the tree was a straw-stuffed effigy labeled "A. O." for Andrew Oliver, the colonist chosen by King George III to impose the Stamp Act. Beside it hung a British cavalry jackboot, its sole painted green. This second effigy represented the two British ministers who were considered responsible for the Stamp Act: the Earl of Bute (the boot being a pun on "Bute") and Lord George Grenville (the green being a pun on "Grenville"). Peering up from inside the boot was a small devil figure, holding a copy of the Stamp Act and bearing a sign that read, "What Greater Joy did ever New England see / Than a Stampman hanging on a Tree!" This was the first public show of defiance against the Crown and spawned the resistance that led to the American Revolutionary War 10 years later.

The tree became a central gathering place for protesters, and the ground surrounding it became popularly known as Liberty Hall. A liberty pole was installed nearby with a flag that could be raised above the tree to summon the townspeople to a meeting. Ebenezer Mackintosh, a shoemaker who handled much of the hands-on work of hanging effigies and leading angry mobs, became known as "Captain General of the Liberty Tree." Paul Revere included the Liberty Tree in an engraving, "A View of the Year 1765".

When the Stamp Act was repealed in 1766, townspeople gathered at the Liberty Tree to celebrate. They decorated the tree with flags and streamers, and when evening fell, hung dozens of lanterns from its branches. A copper sign was fastened to the trunk which read, "This tree was planted in the year 1646, and pruned by order of the Sons of Liberty, Feb. 14th, 1766." Soon colonists in other towns, from Newport, Rhode Island to Charleston, South Carolina, began naming their own liberty trees, and the Tree of Liberty became a familiar symbol of the American Revolution.

Other protests

The Loyal Nine eventually became part of a larger group, the Sons of Liberty. They continued to use the Liberty Tree as a gathering place for protests, leading loyalist Peter Oliver to write bitterly in 1781,

This Tree stood in the Town, & was consecrated for an Idol for the Mob to Worship; it was properly the Tree ordeal, where those, whom the Rioters pitched upon as State delinquents, were carried to for Trial, or brought to as the Test of political Orthodoxy.

During the Liberty Riot of 1768, to protest the seizure of John Hancock's ship by the Royal Navy, townspeople dragged a customs commissioner's boat out of the harbor all the way to the Liberty Tree, where it was condemned at a mock trial and burned on Boston Common. Two years later, a funeral procession for the victims of the Boston Massacre passed by the tree. It was also the site of protests against the Tea Act. In 1774, a customs official and staunch loyalist named John Malcolm was stripped to the waist, tarred and feathered, and forced to announce his resignation under the tree. The following year, Thomas Paine published an ode to the Liberty Tree in The Pennsylvania Gazette.

In the years leading up to the war, the British made the Liberty Tree an object of ridicule. British soldiers tarred and feathered a man named Thomas Ditson, and forced him to march in front of the tree. During the Siege of Boston, a party of British soldiers and Loyalists led by Nathaniel Coffin Jr. or by Job Williams cut the tree down, knowing what it represented to the patriots, and used it for firewood. Later, in the Raid on Charlottetown (1775), American privateers sought revenge against the man who cut the tree down, Loyalist Nathaniel Coffin Jr.

Following the British evacuation in 1776, patriots returning to Boston erected a liberty pole at the site. For many years the tree stump was used as a reference point by local citizens, similar to the Boston Stone. During an 1825 tour of Boston, the Marquis de Lafayette declared, "The world should never forget the spot where once stood Liberty Tree, so famous in your annals."

Memorials

At the 1964 New York World's Fair a sculpture of the tree designed by Albert Surman was a featured exhibit in the New England Pavilion. When the Liberty Tree Mall was opened in 1972, the sculpture was installed at center court.

In October 1966, the Boston Herald began running stories pointing out that the only commemoration of the Liberty Tree site was a grimy plaque, installed in the 1850s, on a building at 630 Washington Street three stories above what is now the intersection of Essex and Washington Streets, a block east of Boston Common. Reporter Ronald Kessler found that the plaque was covered with bird droppings and obscured by a Kemp's hamburger sign. Local guidebooks did not mention it.

To call attention to how obscure the site had become, Kessler interviewed waitresses at the Essex Delicatessen below the bas relief plaque on Washington Street. None knew what the Liberty Tree was. "The Liberty Tree? That's a roast beef sandwich with a slice of Bermuda onion, Russian dressing, and a side of potato salad," said one waitress who had worked beneath the plaque for 20 years.

Kessler persuaded then Massachusetts Governor John A. Volpe to visit the site. A photo of Volpe examining the plaque from a fire engine ladder appeared on page one of the 6 October 1966 edition of the Boston Herald.

In 1974, funding was approved for a small park at Washington and Essex, which at that time was part of an area known as the Combat Zone. Plans to plant trees there had to be scrapped because there were too many underground utilities. The Boston Redevelopment Authority ultimately placed a small bronze plaque in the sidewalk across the street from the bas relief plaque. The plaque bears the inscription "SONS OF LIBERTY, 1766; INDEPENDENCE of their COUNTRY, 1776."

In December 2018, the city finally opened Liberty Tree Plaza at 2 Boylston Street, across the street from the original bas relief. The plaza has tables and chairs, landscaping, lighting, an elm tree to commemorate the original tree that British soldiers cut down in 1775 before the outbreak of the American Revolution, and a stone monument inscribed with the history of the Liberty Tree. The Liberty Tree "became a rallying point for colonists protesting the British-imposed Stamp Act in 1765 and became an important symbol of their cause," the inscription says. "These 'Sons of Liberty' began the struggle that led to the Revolutionary War and American independence."

Boston's Old State House museum houses one of the flags that flew above the Liberty Tree, and one of the original lanterns hung from the tree during the Stamp Act repeal celebration in 1766.

Other trees

Many other towns designated their own Liberty Trees. Most have been lost over time, although Randolph, New Jersey claims a white oak Liberty Tree dating to 1720. A 400-year-old tulip poplar stood on the grounds of St. John's College in Annapolis, Maryland until 1999, when it was felled after Hurricane Floyd caused irreparable damage to it. The Liberty Tree in Acton, Massachusetts, was an elm tree that lasted until about 1925. In 1915, knowing that the Liberty Tree was getting older, Acton students planted the Peace Tree, a maple that still stands today.

The Arbres de la liberté ("Liberty Trees"), inspired by the American example, were a symbol of the French Revolution, the first being planted in 1790 by a pastor of a Vienne village, inspired by the Liberty Tree of Boston. The last surviving liberty elm in France from c.1790 still stands in the parish of La Madeleine at Faycelles, in the Département de Lot. Liberty trees were also planted on the Place Royale in Brussels on 9 July 1794, after the occupation of the Austrian Netherlands by French revolutionary forces, and on Dam Square in Amsterdam on 19 January 1795, in celebration of the alliance between the French Republic and the Batavian Republic.

Tipu Sultan gave his support to French soldiers at Srirangapatna in setting Jacobin club in 1797.
Tipu himself called Citizen Tipu and he planted the Tree of Liberty at srirangapatana.

The Gernikako Arbola in the Basque town of Gernika acted as a meeting place for citizens of the province since at least the 14th century. The tree represents the traditional freedoms of the Biscayan people. Nowadays the president of the Basque Country known as the Lehendakari swears his charge there.

In 1798, with the establishing of the short-lived Roman Republic, such a tree was also planted in Rome's Piazza delle Scole, to mark the legal abolition of the Roman Ghetto (which was, however, re-instated with the resumption of Papal rule). The last surviving liberty elm in Italy, planted in 1799 to celebrate the new Parthenopean Republic, stood until recently in Montepaone, Calabria. The tree was badly damaged in a storm in 2008 and has been replaced by a clone.

As students at the Tübinger Stift, the German philosopher Georg Hegel and his friend Friedrich Schelling planted a liberty tree on the outskirts of Tübingen, Germany.

Thomas Jefferson
Besides actual trees, the term "Tree of Liberty" is associated with a quotation from a 1787 letter written by Thomas Jefferson to William Stephens Smith: "The tree of liberty must be refreshed from time to time with the blood of patriots and tyrants."

See also
 "Liberty Tree", a poem by Thomas Paine (Wikisource)
 Pine Tree Flag, sometimes called the Liberty Tree Flag
 Liberty Generation 
 List of elm trees
 List of individual trees
 Sir Francis Bernard, 1st Baronet

References

External links 

 "A View of the Year 1765" by Paul Revere (engraving)
 "Liberty Tree" by Thomas Paine (poem)
 
 

1770s individual tree deaths
18th century in Boston
American Revolution
Boston Common
Chinatown, Boston
Destroyed individual trees
History of Boston
History of the Thirteen Colonies
Individual elm trees
Individual trees in Massachusetts
Liberty symbols
Massachusetts in the American Revolution